Charles Courtenay may refer to:

 Charles Courtenay, 19th Earl of Devon (born 1975), barrister
 Charles Leslie Courtenay (died 1894), Canon of Windsor